Pénélope is a French-language opera by the composer Niccolò Piccinni, first performed at Fontainebleau on 2 November 1785 in the presence of King Louis XVI and his queen Marie-Antoinette. It takes the form of a tragédie lyrique in three acts. The libretto, by Jean-François Marmontel, is based on the story of Odysseus (Ulysses) and Penelope in Homer's Odyssey. The opera transferred to the Académie Royale de Musique, Paris (the Paris Opera) on 6 December 1785, but it was not a success.

Roles

Notes

Sources
  Félix Clément and Pierre Larousse Dictionnaire des Opéras, p.523
  Original libretto at BNF Gallica

1785 operas
Operas
French-language operas
Operas by Niccolò Piccinni
Tragédies en musique
Operas based on classical mythology
Operas based on the Odyssey